The List of Astana Team riders contains riders from . For the 2006 team known as Astana see List of Liberty Seguros riders.

2007 (Astana Team)

2008 (Astana Team)

2009 (Astana Team)

2010 (Astana Team)

2011 (Astana Team)

2012 (Astana Team)

2013 (Astana Team)

2014 (Astana Team)

2015 (Astana Team)

2016

2017

2018

2019

2020

2021

2022

2023

Notes

See also

References

External links

Astana Team
riders